The barred cuckoo-dove (Macropygia unchall) is a bird species in the family Columbidae. It is native to South and Southeast Asia, and listed as Least Concern on the IUCN Red List.

Taxonomy 

German herpetologist Johann Georg Wagler first described the barred cuckoo-dove in 1827. It has three recognized subspecies:
 M. u. tusalia (Blyth, 1843)
 M. u. minor (Swinhoe, 1870)
 M. u. unchall (Wagler, 1827)

Description 

The barred cuckoo-dove has a buff coloured throat and forehead which becomes pinkish grey at the crown. measures  in length, and weighs .  Its iris is yellow or pale brown, the beak is black and short, and the feet are red. It has blackish brown upperparts. The back, mantle (between the nape and the starting of the back), rump, wing coverts, and scapulars have reddish brown fringes. The tail is blackish brown, and is heavily barred reddish brown.

It is similar to the little cuckoo-dove, but it is much larger and darker, and is black-barred on the mantle, breast, coverts, and tail.

Distribution and habitat 
The barred cuckoo-dove occurs from the Himalayas to Southeast Asia. It prefers clearings and edges of old-growth forests and second growth forests.

Behavior and ecology 
The barred cuckoo-dove lives in small flocks.
It has a loud kro-uum or u-va vocalization, in which the second note is louder than the first.

Status and conservation 
Since 1998, the barred cuckoo-dove has been listed least concern on the IUCN Red List, because it has a large range—more than 20,000 km2 (7,700 mi2) and the population trend is stable. Also, although its population numbers have not been determined, it is thought to comprise more than 10,000 individuals.

Local names 
The Lepcha people of Sikkim call it .

References

External links
 
 
 Oriental Bird Images: Barred Cuckoo Dove  Selected images

barred cuckoo-dove
Birds of Eastern Himalaya
Birds of South China
Birds of Southeast Asia
barred cuckoo-dove
Taxonomy articles created by Polbot